Menegazzia hypogymnioides is a species of foliose lichen in the family Parmeliaceae. Found in Australia, the species was described as new to science by Australian lichenologist Gintaras Kantvilas in 2012. The specific epithet refers to its similarity to a small species of Hypogymnia. It is a very rare species that occurs only at high elevations in southwestern Tasmania, typically in sheltered habitats.

See also
List of Menegazzia species

References

hypogymnioides
Lichen species
Lichens described in 2012
Lichens of Australia
Taxa named by Gintaras Kantvilas